is a carnival block in Olinda, Brazil. The block was created in 1931 by Luciano Anacleto de Queiroz, Sebastião da Silva, Cosme José dos Santos, Heliodoro Pereira da Silva, and shoemaker Manoel Joaquim dos Santos. It parades on carnival Saturday midnight at Olinda's historical center, being the first block to perform.
frevo is the main played rhythm, but others are also played, such as samba and marchinhas.

O Homem da Meia Noite is an intangible cultural heritage of Pernambuco'' since 2006.

History 
Luciano Anacleto de Queiroz, Sebastião da Silva, Cosme José dos Santos, Heliodoro Pereira da Silva, and shoemaker Manoel Joaquim dos Santos (Neco Monstro) were not accepted at the block's board, and decided to create the new block.
Back then, Cariri Olindense was the first block to parade at Olinda's carnival.
Thus, to rival with them, the founders decided to parade at the midnight hour between carnival's Saturday and Sunday, becoming the opening act since then.
Later, both blocks have reconciled. Now it is a tradition that Homem da Meia-Noite hands in the city key to Cariri right after its parade.

Between 1931 and 1932, Homem da Meia-Noite had only a standard (with a clock showing midnight hour) and the doll. After, it has incorporated other carnival elements. The block did not parade between 1950 and 1953 due to financial issues.

Family 

Other characters have been created in association to Homem da Meia-Noite.  was created in 1967. The doll only parades on Sunday, thus only meets Homem da Meia Noite when all giant dolls parade together.
The figure was created by the craftsman Julião das Máscaras, whom  inspired at Monalisa. It has long dark hair,  a gold tooth smile, and wears yellow and blue in a reference to Yemọja e Oshun.
Homem and Mulher were "officially" married in a ceremony in February 1990.

 is the first offspring of the marriage between Homem da Meia-Noite and Mulher do Dia. The figure was create in 1974 also by Julião das Máscaras. He is dressed as an adult.
In 1977  was created by Sílvio Botelho. The character is vain girl which has news clothes every carnival.

References

Olinda
Brazilian Carnival
Parades in Brazil
Festivals established in 1931